The women's 3000 metres walk event  at the 1989 European Athletics Indoor Championships was held on 18 and 19 February.

Medalists

Results

Heats
First 4 from each heat (Q) and the next 4 fastest (q) qualified for the final.

Final

References

Racewalking at the European Athletics Indoor Championships
3000
Euro